Actaea is a genus of crabs in the family Xanthidae, containing the following species:

Actaea acantha (H. Milne-Edwards, 1834)
Actaea allisoni Garth, 1985
Actaea angusta Rathbun, 1898
Actaea areolata (Dana, 1852)
Actaea bifrons Rathbun, 1898
Actaea bocki Odhner, 1925
Actaea calculosa (H. Milne-Edwards, 1834)
Actaea capricornensis Ward, 1933
Actaea carcharias White, 1848
Actaea catalai Guinot, 1976
Actaea flosculata Alcock, 1898
Actaea fragifera (White, 1848)
Actaea glandifera Rathbun, 1914
Actaea granulata
Actaea grimaldii Ng & Bouchet, 2015
Actaea hieroglyphica Odhner, 1925
Actaea hystrix Miers, 1886
Actaea jacquelinae Guinot, 1976
Actaea occidentalis Odhner, 1925
Actaea peronii (H. Milne-Edwards, 1834)
Actaea perspinosa Borradaile, 1902
Actaea petalifera Odhner, 1925
Actaea picta Zehntner, 1894
Actaea polyacantha (Heller, 1861)
Actaea polydora (Herbst, 1801)
Actaea pura Stimpson, 1858
Actaea rueppellii (Krauss, 1843)
Actaea sabae Nobili, 1905
Actaea savignii (H. Milne-Edwards, 1834)
Actaea semblatae Guinot, 1976
Actaea spinosissima Borradaile, 1902
Actaea spongiosa (Dana, 1852)
Actaea squamosa Henderson, 1893
Actaea squamulosa Odhner, 1925
Actaea tessellata Pocock, 1890

References

Xanthoidea